The old Mitchell County Courthouse is an historic courthouse located at Bakersville, Mitchell County, North Carolina.  It was built in 1907–1908, and is a two-story cast stone building in a vernacular Classical Revival style.  It has a hipped roof with a two-stage square cupola crowned by a domical roof.  It has four-sided turret-like corner bays.

It was added to the National Register of Historic Places in 1979. The new courthouse building was constructed in 2003 nearby on Long View Drive, replacing the historic courthouse. The old courthouse building currently houses the county Board of Elections office, as well as the Historical Society and Rural Education Partnership.

References

County courthouses in North Carolina
Courthouses on the National Register of Historic Places in North Carolina
Neoclassical architecture in North Carolina
Government buildings completed in 1908
Buildings and structures in Mitchell County, North Carolina
National Register of Historic Places in Mitchell County, North Carolina
1908 establishments in North Carolina